Alkiviades David (born May 1968; pronounced  ) is a Greek-British businessman and actor. In 2008 he was the majority shareholder of Leventis-David Group, which owns Coca-Cola Hellenic bottling plants in 28 countries. His companies include the Internet-based television provider FilmOn, the home-shopping website 9021go.com, the streaming-video site BattleCam.com, and the modelling agency Independent Models. He has also appeared in feature films and on television. In a 2021 interview with The Daily Beast about an $80 million judgement against him for sexual battery, David claimed to be "completely exhausted" of cash resources, and added prior claims he was a billionaire were "complete fiction" he had manufactured. Following judgements levied against him in multiple suits, David alleged the California court system was part of a corrupt conspiracy and publicly refused to comply with court ordered payments. After failing to appear at multiple court-ordered appearances, David's lawyer reported there were discussions underway to place him into conservatorship as his client was suffering from "downward spiralling mental health" issues.

Early life
Alkiviades David was born in May 1968, in Lagos, Nigeria, to a trading and shipping family of Greek Cypriot origin. His father, Andrew A. David (1934–2000), was born in Petra, Cyprus and went on to study business at Trinity College in Dublin, Ireland. In 1957, Andrew A. David joined the family business, the Leventis-David Group in Ghana, where he managed Coca-Cola Bottling Plant in Accra.

David attended high school in Switzerland and studied film at the Royal College of Art.

Career
In 1998, he co-founded the London modelling agency Independent Models, whose models included Helena Christensen.

In 2006, David partnered with veteran film producer Elliott Kastner to launch 111 Pictures Ltd., a UK-based independent production and international sales company. Also that year, David started FilmOn, an online streaming site.

He has appeared in films, including a 2008 motion picture, The Bank Job, in which David played a tunneling expert hired by Jason Statham to help with a bank heist.

According to The Sunday Times Rich List in 2020 his net worth, combined with the Leventis family, was estimated at £2.35 billion. However, various news reports in 2021 quoted David as noting billionaire claims were his own fabrications, and following multi-million-dollar judgements against him claimed he was "exhausted" of any funds.

Personal life
David has been married three times and divorced twice, and has two sons, Andrew and Alexander, with his first wife. He met second wife Emma McAllister in 2004, marrying her in 2007, and separating in 2009. As of 2011 he is married to Jennifer Stano, a swimsuit designer and former model who founded Have Faith Swimwear with David in Beverly Hills, California, in 2010.
In May 2019, it was reported that David was arrested in St. Kitts after US$1.5 million of cannabis was found on his private plane.

Business
David's projects include:

FilmOn, a video on-demand website and mobile service which is an extension of his 111Pix distribution venture.
BattleCam.com, a peer-to-peer video streaming website and community whose offerings including Fight Night and other pay-per-view tournaments built around mixed martial arts, gaming and comedy. David advertised for this venture by offering cash to the first person who streaks in a legal manner in front of US President Barack Obama, and by hosting a faked assisted suicide.
9021go.com, a home shopping site founded in 2011
Hologram USA Theatre on Hollywood Boulevard.

Litigations
CBS, ABC, NBC, Fox Broadcasting and their studios won a temporary restraining order against David's FilmOn in November 2010 to prevent unlicensed use of their broadcast signals. David sued CBS, dropped the suit, and sued CBS Interactive in November 2011, alleging copyright infringement due to the CNET website having editorially covered infringing uses of peer-to-peer file-sharing software. In June 2013, David filed a countersuit against the four networks seeking a ruling that providing Internet technology for receiving over-the-air broadcast signals at no charge does not violate broadcasters' copyrights.

In April 2019 a jury decided David should pay $11 million in damages to a woman who accused him of sexual assault, including $8 million in punitive damages and $3 million in compensatory damages. The woman accused David of firing her after she turned down his sexual advances and alleged he groped her in the workplace. Her complaint also accused him of showing lewd photos to employees and hiring a stripper in the workplace.

In 2019 the U.S. Securities and Exchange Commission filed complaints claiming David "engaged in a fraudulent scheme to induce the investing public to buy securities of Hologram and its subsidiary in unlawfully unregistered offerings, through materially false and misleading representations" in violation of the Securities Act of 1933. David was ordered to pay $100,000 in fines and was enjoined from being an officer in publicly held companies for a period of five years.

In 2019, David was arrested at the airport in St Kitts and Nevis for possession of over EC$1.3 million worth of cannabis after a search of his private jet.

Filmography

References

External links 

 

1968 births
Alumni of Institut Le Rosey
Greek billionaires
Living people
Residents of Lagos
People from Beverly Hills, California
People educated at Stowe School